Mesen or Masen or Mesan or Mosan or Masan may refer to:
 Mesen, Chaharmahal and Bakhtiari (مسن - Mesen)
 Mesan, East Azerbaijan (مسن - Mesan)
 Mesen, Hormozgan (مسن - Mesen)
 Masan, Kurdistan (ماسان - Māsān)
 Masen (ماسن - Māsen), South Khorasan Province